René-Jean de Botherel du Plessis (1745–1805) was a French counter-revolutionary.

1745 births
1805 deaths
French counter-revolutionaries
War in the Vendée